Harrison  is a suburb of the district of Gungahlin in Canberra, Australia. The suburb is named after the former city planner Peter Harrison, who was instrumental in reviving Walter Burley Griffin's plan for the National Capital. The suburb is adjacent to the suburbs of Franklin, Gungahlin, Throsby, Kenny and the industrial estate Mitchell. Harrison's place names reflects those of "natural features, waterfalls, plains, tablelands and plateaux". The suburb is located approximately 2 km east of the Gungahlin Town Centre and about 10 km from the centre of Canberra.

After the launch of Light Rail on 20 April by ACT government, Harrison residents can enjoy the benefits of Light Rail from any of the Flemington Road stops.

Schools

Parks

Geology

Harrison is underlaid mostly by the Canberra Formation mudstone or volcanics from the late middle Silurian age.
Near the eastern corner is an outcrop of the Ainslie Volcanics dacite or andesite.

Footnotes

Suburbs of Canberra